Garcinia decussata also known as the "hat stand tree" is a species of flowering plant in the family Clusiaceae. A relative of the mangosteen, it is a small tree less than 3 m in height. This plant, found only in Jamaica, is being researched the University of the West Indies for possible use in the treatment of HIV/AIDS. It is threatened by habitat loss though it can still be found in areas of the John Crow Mountains.

References

Vulnerable plants
decussata
Endemic flora of Jamaica
Taxonomy articles created by Polbot